James Jonathan Bull (born 22 December 1976) is an English cricketer.  Bull is a right-handed batsman who bowls right-arm off break.  He was born at Leicester, Leicestershire.

Bull made his first-class debut for Oxford University against Northamptonshire in 1996.  From 1996 to 1999, he represented the University in 11 first-class matches, the last of which came against Cambridge University.  In his 11 first-class matches, he scored 246 runs at a batting average of 15.37, with a high score of 47.  In the field he took a single catch.

In 2001, Bull represented the Leicestershire Cricket Board in a single List A match against the Warwickshire Cricket Board in the 2001 Cheltenham & Gloucester Trophy.  In his only List A match he scored 10 runs and took a single catch.  With the ball he took a single wicket at a cost of 12 runs.

He currently plays club cricket for Loughborough Town Cricket Club in the Leicestershire Premier Cricket League.

References

External links
James Bull at Cricinfo
James Bull at CricketArchive

1976 births
Living people
Cricketers from Leicester
English cricketers
Oxford University cricketers
Leicestershire Cricket Board cricketers
Alumni of Keble College, Oxford